Elisa Au (born May 29, 1981 in Honolulu, Hawaii) is an American martial arts instructor and karate practitioner.

Biography 
Elisa Au was born on May 29, 1981 in Honolulu, Hawaii to Gary and Jane Au. With the encouragement of her parents she began taking karate lessons at age five under the tutelage of shitō-ryū karate master Chuzo Kotaka. In 1990, Au competed in her first major tournament the AAU/United States National Karate Championships in New Orleans, Louisiana. She won gold, silver, and bronze medals at the event.

In 1991, Au received her black belt under Kotaka and his International Karate Federation. As a teenager in her native Hawaii, she began teaching after school karate programs. Several of her students went on to become national champions, including one who would win two junior world championships.

By the age of 18, Au had won three WKO World Championships and two WKC World Championships. In addition to her demanding karate schedule, she participated in figure skating, gymnastics, canoe paddling, and track and field, while attending Punahou School — an elite college preparatory academy in Hawaii. She also excelled academically and maintained honor roll status throughout high school. In 2003, Au graduated from the University of Hawaii with a degree in civil engineering.

Au continues to compete and make national and international appearances. In addition to competition, she teaches seminars  around the world, including Japan, Canada, Australia and the U.S. She also stars in a six-set DVD series entitled SECRETS of Championship Karate that shares her training methods and ideas along with tips on how to succeed in karate competition.

DVD 
 Elisa Au: Secrets of Championship Karate - Kihon (2006)
 Elisa Au: Secrets of Championship Karate - Kata for Beginners (2006)
 Elisa Au: Secrets of Championship Karate - Kata for Int/Adv (2006)
 Elisa Au: Secrets of Championship Karate - Kumite Beginners (2006)
 Elisa Au: Secrets of Championship Karate - Kumite Black Belt (2006)
 Elisa Au: Secrets of Championship Karate - Conditioning and Speed Drills (2006)

Championships
 3 x WKF World Champion
 2010 WKF Bronze Medalist, first team kumite medal for USA
 2010 World Combat Games Silver Medalist
 2008 WKF Silver Medalist
 2004 WKF Champion, 2 individual Gold medals
 2002 WKF Champion
 2002 World Cup Champion
 4-Time Pan Am Champion
 Two-Time WKC World Champion
 Two-Time WKO World Champion
 18-Time United States of America National Karate Federation (USANKF) Champion
 9-Time Amateur Athletic Union (AAU) Champion

Personal

References

External links
 
 Fonseca Martial Arts
 
 

1981 births
Living people
American female karateka
Sportspeople from Chicago
Punahou School alumni
Sportspeople from Honolulu
University of Hawaiʻi at Mānoa alumni
World Games silver medalists
Competitors at the 2005 World Games
Shitō-ryū practitioners
World Games medalists in karate
21st-century American women